1889 Pakhmutova, provisional designation , is a carbonaceous asteroid from the outer region of the asteroid belt, approximately 35 kilometers in diameter.

It was discovered by Russian astronomer Lyudmila Chernykh at the Crimean Astrophysical Observatory in Nauchnyj on 24 January 1968. The asteroid was named after Russian composer Aleksandra Pakhmutova.

Orbit and classification 

Pakhmutova orbits the Sun in the outer main-belt at a distance of 2.7–3.4 AU once every 5 years and 5 months (1,984 days). Its orbit has an eccentricity of 0.11 and an inclination of 13° with respect to the ecliptic.

Physical characteristics 

Pakhmutova has been characterized as a carbonaceous C-type asteroid.

Diameter and albedo 

This asteroid has a mean-diameter between 33.53 and 37.68 kilometers, and an albedo between 0.05 and 0.0752, as measured by the space-based Akari, IRAS and WISE/NEOWISE surveys. The Collaborative Asteroid Lightcurve Link derives an albedo of 0.0574 and a diameter of 33.41 kilometers with an absolute magnitude of 11.1.

Rotation period and poles 

In February 2006, a rotational lightcurve was obtained by American astronomer Brian Warner at his Palmer Divide Observatory in Colorado. Lightcurve analysis gave a rotation period of 17.490 hours with a brightness variation of 0.50 in magnitude. Photometric observations at the Palomar Transient Factory in February 2012, gave a period of 17.5226 hours and an amplitude of 0.49 magnitude.

In 2011, a modeled lightcurve using data from the Uppsala Asteroid Photometric Catalogue (UAPC) and other sources gave a period 17.5157 hours, as well as a spin axis of (22.0°, –76.0°; 167.0°, –40.0°) in ecliptic coordinates (λ, β).

Naming 

This minor planet was named in honor of the Russian composer Aleksandra Pakhmutova, one of the best known figures in Soviet and later Russian popular music. The official  was published by the Minor Planet Center on 20 February 1976.

Notes

References

External links 
 Asteroid Lightcurve Database (LCDB), query form (info )
 Dictionary of Minor Planet Names, Google books
 Asteroids and comets rotation curves, CdR – Observatoire de Genève, Raoul Behrend
 Discovery Circumstances: Numbered Minor Planets (1)-(5000) – Minor Planet Center
 
 

001889
Discoveries by Lyudmila Chernykh
Named minor planets
19680124